The Puteri Beach is a beach in Tanjung Kling, Central Melaka, Melaka, Malaysia.

History
The beach used to be named Kundor Beach. It started to be developed by the Malacca State Government since 1990. In April 2021, rock revetment was constructed along the beach to save it from coastal erosion which has spread over a length of 100 meters.

Geology
The beach stretches for 2.1 km along the shore facing the Malacca Strait on the southwestern edge of Melaka.

Features
The beach is equipped with prayer room, public toilets, restaurants, food stalls and hotels.

Activities
Various activities are found around the beach, ranging from fishing, camping as well as work place for fishermen. It also has night market stretching along the road in parallel with the shore line.

See also
 Geography of Malaysia
 List of tourist attractions in Melaka

References

Beaches of Melaka
Central Melaka District